Jeff Davis (born 19 March 1958) is an American former ski jumper who competed in the 1980 Winter Olympics.

References

1958 births
Living people
American male ski jumpers
Olympic ski jumpers of the United States
Ski jumpers at the 1980 Winter Olympics
Place of birth missing (living people)